Weibersbach is a small river of Bavaria, Germany. It is right tributary of the Kahl in Michelbach, a district of Alzenau.

See also
List of rivers of Bavaria

Rivers of Bavaria
Rivers of Germany